Mstislav II Svyatoslavich (c. 1168 – 31 May 1223) was a Rus'  prince (a member of the Rurik dynasty). His baptismal name was Panteleymon. He was probably prince of Kozelsk (1194–1223), of Novgorod-Seversk (1206–1219), and of Chernigov (1215/1220–1223). He was killed in the Battle of the Kalka River.

His life
He was the youngest son of Grand Prince Svyatoslav Vsevolodovich of Kiev and Maria Vasilkovna of Polotsk.

At the beginning of 1182, when his father and Prince Vsevolod Yuryevich of Suzdalia concluded peace, the latter promised to give his wife’s sister as wife to Mstislav. Mstislav married Yasynya (whose Christian name was Marfa) at the beginning of 1183.

In the summer of 1184, his father launched a major campaign against the Cumans and summoned him.
In 1189, after the Hungarians had occupied the principality of Halych, his father agreed to attack them with Prince Rurik Rostislavich of Belgorod, and Mstislav rode with his father. However, his father and Rurik Rostislavich failed to reach an agreement on the partition of the lands to be occupied, and thus they returned home. In 1192, his father sent him and his elder brothers (Vladimir and Vsevolod Svyatoslavich) to take part in the campaign of Igor Svyatoslavich, Prince of Novgorod-Seversk against the Cumans, but on seeing that they were outnumbered Igor Svyatoslavich resolutely ordered his troops to steal away under the cover of darkness.

His father died in the last week of July 1194 and his only brother, Yaroslav II Vsevolodovich of Chernigov, became the senior prince of his dynasty; thus the genealogical reshuffle made Svyatoslav Vsevolodovich's sons (among them Mstislav) answerable to their uncle. Mstislav probably inherited Kozelsk from his father who divided up the Vyatichi lands among his several sons.

In 1196, when Mstislav’s brother-in-law, Vsevolod Yuryevich (accompanied by the princes of Ryazan, Murom, and the Cumans) attacked the principality of Chernigov, his uncle ordered Mstislav to accompany him against Vsevolod Yuryevich.

Mstislav probably got the principality of Novgorod Seversk in the early summer of 1206, when its former ruler, Vladimir Igorevich became the prince of Halych. Shortly afterwards, his eldest brother, Vsevolod Svyatoslavich snatched Kiev from Rurik Rostislavich, and their brother, Gleb Svyatoslavich occupied Chernihiv. Although, Mstislav was next in line for a major domain, his eldest brother bypassed him and gave Pereyaslavl to his own son Michael of Chernigov. Rurik Rostislavich, however, was determined to regain control of Kiev, and he expelled Vsevolod Svyatoslavich; but the latter refused to give up and marched against Kiev at the beginning of 1207. His attacking force constituted his two brothers, Gleb and Mstislav with their sons. But Rurik Rostislavich was prepared for the attack and successfully kept the besiegers outside the walls, and thus they pillaged around Kiev for three week but accomplished nothing and withdrew.

His brother, Gleb Svyatoslavich, prince of Chernigov was last mentioned under 1215, and Mstislav replaced him as senior prince. Consequently, when in the winter of 1220, the Lithuanians pillaged the lands of the Olgovichi (the ruling dynasty of Chernigov), Mstislav set out in pursuit from Chernihiv, caught the raiders, killed them all, and retrieved the plundered goods. In 1221, Mstislav participated in the campaign Prince Mstislav Mstislavich the Bold lead against Halych.

In the spring of 1223, the Tatars (the Mongols) arrived on the frontiers of Rus’ and attacked the Cumans; the latter, unable to withstand the onslaught, fled to Rus’ warning the princes. Under the influence of Mstislav Mstislavich the Bold several of the Russian princes (among them Mstislav, and Grand Prince Mstislav Romanovich of Kiev) agreed to cooperate with the Cumans against the Mongols. The first skirmish took place on the banks of the Dnieper River, and in this vanguard battle Mstislav Mstislavich succeeded in defeating a detachment of Mongol troops. After their victory, the Russian armies crossed the river and marched through the steppes for 8 days before they met the main Mongol force at the banks of the Kalka River. There, without consultation with the princes of Kiev and Chernihiv, Mstislav Mstislavich the Bold and the Cumans attacked the Mongols. The results were disastrous: their forces were disorganized, and a number of princes, including Mstislav and his son, perished during the flight. Their body was left to the mercy of prairie scavengers.

Marriage and children
#1183: Yasynya (Marfa), the sister of Maria, the wife of Prince Vsevolod Yuryevich of Suzdalia
Dmitry Mstislavich (c. 1185 – May 31, 1223)
Andrey Mstislavich
Ioann Mstislavich
Gavriil Mstislavich

Ancestors

Footnotes

Sources
Dimnik, Martin: The Dynasty of Chernigov - 1146-1246; Cambridge University Press, 2003, Cambridge; .
Vernadsky, George: Kievan Russia; Yale University Press, 1948, New Haven and London; .

12th-century princes in Kievan Rus'
Olgovichi family
Princes of Chernigov
Eastern Orthodox monarchs
13th-century princes in Kievan Rus'
1223 deaths
Year of birth uncertain